Tripping Daisy is a neo-psychedelic pop rock band that was formed in Dallas, Texas, by lead singer/guitarist Tim DeLaughter in 1990 along with Jeff Bouck (drums), Wes Berggren (guitar) and Mark Pirro (bass). 

The group disbanded in 1999 following the sudden death of Berggren. The remaining members reformed in 2017 for a reunion performance at the Homegrown Festival in Dallas, following which they played a number of concerts in Texas during 2017 and 2019.

History

First album
After playing local gigs, the band released their first single, "Lost and Found", which received moderate airplay on local radio station KDGE. The band incorporated a light show similar to The Joshua Light Show at the Fillmore East. It used effects such as hand made slide shows with multi layered 16 mm projections along with oil and water. This visual attention was present in their very first show and was the beginning of many multimedia attractions to come.

The band soon began recording what would become their first full-length album, Bill, released on the independent label Dragon Street Records. The album was a favorite on Dallas radio. The sound on Bill is characterized by the heavy use of vocal effects and unconventional riffs, both of which lend to a neo-psychedelic sound. Bill was re-released on major label Island Records, with a different mix and mastering from the Dragon Street version. It also excludes the cover song "Green Tamborine".

In 1992 Bryan Wakeland replaced Jeff Bouck as the band's drummer. The band released a live album in 1994 titled Get It On. The album closes with a cover of the Bad Religion song "We're Only Gonna Die". DeLaughter has been noted as saying in 1990s era interviews that the record label pushed the live album out to capitalize on the popularity of Bill, and it is not one of his favorite albums.

Commercial breakthrough
After signing a deal with Island Records, which re-released Bill (minus the cover song "Green Tambourine"), the band recorded their first major-label release, I Am an Elastic Firecracker. The music video for the song "I Got a Girl" received extended airplay on MTV. A segment of the video was used in a Beavis and Butt-Head episode, a show known to lampoon popular music videos of the time. Wakeland remained in the band until after the tour for I Am an Elastic Firecracker when he chose to leave, and was replaced by Mitch Marine and Cory Lemons. Phil Karnats joined the band on lead guitar soon after Wakeland's departure, allowing DeLaughter more freedom to focus on lead vocal duty.

Later albums
The band's third album, Jesus Hits Like the Atom Bomb, was a mix of both creativity and experimentalism. DeLaughter has been quoted as saying that the album "is the band at their best". The album has a fragmented style: from one vignette to another. While the album was not a commercial success, it was critically acclaimed; the Dallas Observer later ranked the album's third track, "Sonic Bloom", at number 100 on their "100 Best Texas Songs of All Time" list. Marine toured with the band until he was replaced by Ben Curtis, who drummed on Jesus Hit Like the Atom Bomb and their fourth album, the self-titled Tripping Daisy. Other releases during this period include Time Capsule (a mix of old demos, b-sides, and one new song – the only officially released studio recording to feature drummer Mitch Marine) and The Tops Off Our Heads (an impromptu "jam" EP recording that marked the band's first post-major label release).

Death of Wes Berggren and split
Wes Berggren was found dead of a drug overdose in his apartment on October 27, 1999. The Dallas County Medical Examiner's office found traces of cocaine, propoxyphene, and benzodiazepine in his body. With Berggren's death, the band cancelled its upcoming tour dates and finished some minor recording sessions for the final album. The self-titled album was released posthumously, with Berggren's father Don playing a Fender Rhodes electric piano on the unfinished song "Soothing Jubilee". The album included a re-recording of "One Through Four", a song originally featured on Bill. Tripping Daisy officially disbanded on December 14, 1999.

After the band disbanded, Tim DeLaughter, Mark Pirro, Bryan Wakeland and Jeff Bouck formed the chamber pop group The Polyphonic Spree. Ben Curtis went on to join brother Brandon Curtis in the progressive space rock trio called The Secret Machines and later, the dream pop trio School of Seven Bells. Curtis died on December 29, 2013, from complications of lymphoma.

Reunion
On January 5, 2017, the band's official Facebook page teased a possible reunion event. News later confirmed the remaining members would perform at the Homegrown Festival in Dallas on May 13, 2017. On March 9, 2017, they announced four additional Texas dates, making it the first Tripping Daisy tour in nearly twenty years.  Christopher Penn announced during Homegrown Fest 8 in Dallas, Texas, on May 13, 2017, that Tripping Daisy would be recording a live album during a concert July 7, 2017, during the NYTEX Summer Concert Series at the NYTEX Sports Centre in North Richland Hills, Texas. The band went idle again until reuniting in 2019 for the 10th Homegrown Festival.

Band members

Current members
Tim DeLaughter – lead vocals, guitar, keyboards, Appalachian dulcimer, Califone (1990–1999, 2017–present)
Mark Pirro – bass guitar, backing vocals, percussion (1990–1999, 2017–present)
Bryan Wakeland – drums (1992–1995, 2017–present)
Philip Karnats – guitar, backing vocals, trumpet, banjo (1997–1999, 2017–present)
Brandon Curtis – keyboards, guitar, backing vocals (2017–present)
Nick Earl – guitar, backing vocals, samples (2017–present)

Touring substitutes
Cory Lemons – drums (1995–1996)
Robert Hubbard – drums (1997–1999)

Former members
Wes Berggren – lead guitar, keyboards, Mellotron, Ace Tone, cello (1990–1999; died 1999)
Jeff Bouck – drums (1990–1992)
Mitch Marine – drums (1995–1997)
Ben Curtis – drums (1997–1999; died 2013)

Recording personnel
Matt Gililland – assistant engineer (1992–1996)

Discography

Albums

EPs

Demo albums 

 Tripping Daisy – the shoe demo cassette

Singles

References

External links

Alternative rock groups from Texas
Musical groups disestablished in 1999
Musical groups established in 1991
Musical groups from Dallas
Grunge musical groups
1991 establishments in Texas
Neo-psychedelia groups
Musical groups reestablished in 2017